New Mexico vernacular is a style of vernacular architecture that blended Pueblo architecture with Territorial Style. Developed by rural Pueblo and Hispano communities during the mid-19th century. The typical form is the one-story hipped box massing, with spare ornamentation of "Italianate brackets and scroll-sawn ornament, lathe-turned or square chamfered columns, wood shingles on gable ends, and diamond-patterned windows".

Examples
Building at 1406 Romero
Building at 2005 Montezuma
Cornelius Sullivan House
James Cook House
Milne-Bush Ranch
Valmora Sanatorium Historic District

See also
Pueblo Revival architecture
Territorial Revival architecture

References

Architectural styles